Lancheras de Cataño Voleibol Club is the professional female volleyball team of Cataño, Puerto Rico.

History
The team was founded in 2008 and played as Caribes de San Sebastián in the 2009 season, then moved to Cataño and renamed Lancheras de Cataño.

In the 2012 season, the team won the League Championship with the American setter Courtney Thompson being awarded as final series Most Valuable Person. The team qualified for 2012 FIVB Club World Championship which was celebrated in Doha, Qatar and finished fourth of six teams.

Squads

Previous

Current
As of October 2012

 Head Coach:  Rafael Olazagasti
 Assistant coach:  Esai Velez

Release or Transfer

References

External links
 League Official website
 Team website

Puerto Rican volleyball clubs
Volleyball clubs established in 2008
2008 establishments in Puerto Rico